Paul Kwabena Boafo is a Ghanaian theologian and minister who was elected as the twelfth Presiding Bishop of the Methodist Church Ghana in 2018. He previously served as the Administrative Bishop of the Church. He is the first ordained minister to serve in both capacities in the episcopal history of the Ghanaian Methodist Church. Boafo also served as the Protestant Chaplain of the Kwame Nkrumah University of Science and Technology (KNUST).

Early life and education 
An ethnic Fante, Paul Kwabena Boafo was born in Asankragua in the Western Region of Ghana to Roman Catholic parents Opanin Paul Kwaw Boafo and Agatha Ama Asamoah Boafo. His mother described him as a sickly child and, by the age of three, he was a frequent patient at the local Catholic hospital.

In 1963, Boafo enrolled as a pupil at the Asankrangwa Roman Catholic Primary School. After his first year in elementary school, he moved to live with his maternal uncle, Reverend John Bennet Nsowah Quasie, then a catechist of the Methodist Church at Ankonsia, near Bawdie in the Western Region. Boafo's uncle was posted to Wa in the Upper West Region after completing his catechist training at the Freeman College in Kumasi.

Boafo then went to the Wa Experimental Primary School and later transferred to other schools in Mangu, Kenyasi, Sefwi Wiawso, and Sefwi-Bekwai due to his uncle's work as a travelling minister. After passing the common entrance examination at the Sefwi Bekwai Methodist Middle School, Boafo was enrolled at the Wenchi Methodist Secondary School from 1972 to 1977, where he obtained his GCE 'O' Level. He went on to the Wesley College, Kumasi, where he trained as a teacher from 1978 to 1981. He was awarded the Men's Prize in 1981, on completion of his tenure as the Men's Secretary.

Between 1989 and 1992, he studied for a bachelor's degree in Philosophy and the Study of Religions at the University of Ghana, Legon. In 1996, he was awarded a World Church Office Scholarship to for his Master of Theology Degree (MTh) at Queen's University, Belfast. Upon the recommendation of the scholarship's sponsors, the Methodist Church in Ireland and the Methodist Church Ghana, he pursued a doctorate in Wesleyan Studies from the same institution. He received a PhD in 1999.

Career

Pastoral work 
Paul Boafo was a pupil teacher at the St. Peter and Paul Anglican Primary School in Saltpond in the Central Region of Ghana in 1977. In his early career, he taught at the Mpasatia Methodist Primary School. Initially a lay preacher, Boafo was commissioned a probationer on 8 June 1986 at the Wesley Cathedral in Accra, and subsequently ordained a full Methodist agent three years later on 27 August 1989 at the Wesley Cathedral in Sunyani. He was a columnist for the Christian Sentinel, the official newspaper of the Methodist Church Ghana. Paul Boafo co-edited the church's Weekly Bible Lesson and edited the Methodist Times from 2000 to 2016.

Paul Boafo was the Methodist chaplain at the Osei Tutu Secondary School at Akropong-Ashanti. Simultaneously, he was the attached adjunct minister to three local congregations in the Amakom circuit.
 Ebenezer Methodist Church, Pankrono, formerly in the Old Tafo Circuit,
 Mount Zion Methodist Church, Ahensan
 Emmanuel Methodist Church, Atonsu

Paul Boafo was the first resident minister at the Akyem Otwereso in the Akim Oda Circuit. Boafo was the Superintendent Minister at the: 
 New Achimota Circuit in the Accra Diocese from 1999 to 2001 
 Accra North Circuit, Adabraka between 2001 and 2005

Boafo also held the following positions: 
 Attester to the Kumasi Synod and Methodist Conferences
 Diocesan Chaplain to the Association of Methodist Men's Fellowships, Kumasi
 Member, Methodist Conference

He was appointed the resident Protestant Chaplain at the KNUST, where he lectured at the Religious Studies Department. He served on different committees including 
 Queen Elizabeth II Hall Council
 KNUST Health Services Management Board
 Committee of University Ecumenical Chaplaincy Board
 KNUST Local Council of Churches
University Syllabus Review Committee, Methodist University College Ghana

Paul Boafo also served as an auxiliary minister at the following four stations:
 Christ the King Methodist Church, Asokwa
 St. Paul's Methodist Church, Kentinkromo
 Aldersgate Methodist Church, Ayigya Annex
 Bethel Methodist Church, Ayigya

Presiding Bishop of the Methodist Church 
After serving as the Administrative Bishop of the Methodist Church Ghana, Boafo was elected as the Presiding Bishop and assumed office after an induction service on 1 October 2018 for a six-year, non-renewable term of office. The induction service, held at the Wesley Cathedral, Cape Coast, saw a grand parade by the Cape Coast Diocesan Brigade under the Command of the Connexional Brigade executives. The cathedral historically and symbolically served as the mother Diocese of the Methodist Church Ghana dating to the first half of the nineteenth century. In attendance at the induction ceremony were 2000 congregants including serving and retired members of the church hierarchy; Diocesan Bishops, Lay Presidents, General Directors and Directors, Synod Secretaries, Lay Chairmen, Boards, Chairmen of Advisory teams, affiliates of the Methodists Church Ghana, Foreign Missions, visitors, invited guests, family and friends and the media. The ceremony was also attended the Vice-President of Ghana, Mahamudu Bawumia.

At the service, he was enrobed in ceremonial vestments for the office and received a staff; a Bible; a ring; and a stole, signifying his new role as the figurehead of the Ghanaian Methodist Church and its heritage, doctrines, teachings and expansion. In his homily, the Presiding Bishop, Titus Kofi Awotwi Pratt, preached on the theme Avail yourselves to God inspired by Judges 13:2-7.

Academia 
Paul Boafo's teaching, research and writing is under Wesleyan theology. By 2000, he had assumed the role of adjunct professor and facilitator in Wesleyan Studies, specialising in theological education and ministerial formation at the Trinity Theological Seminary, Legon. He had a similar stint at the Methodist University College, Dansoman where he taught causes in professional ethics in a Wesleyan context. At the Freeman Centre for Leadership and Development, he led the facilitation of evangelist education. He was appointed a senior lecturer in historical theology at the Kwame Nkrumah University of Science and Technology (KNUST). He is a professional scholar of the American-based Wesleyan Philosophical Society and Wesleyan Theological Society.

Personal life 
Paul Boafo is married with children.

References 

Living people
Year of birth missing (living people)
Academic staff of Kwame Nkrumah University of Science and Technology
Academic staff of the University of Ghana
Akan people
Alumni of Queen's University Belfast
Fante people
Ghanaian chaplains
Ghanaian clergy
Ghanaian Methodists
University of Ghana alumni
Trinity Theological Seminary, Legon alumni
Academic staff of Trinity Theological Seminary, Legon